Köhnəkənd is a village in the Lachin District of Azerbaijan.

History 
The village was located in the Armenian-occupied territories surrounding Nagorno-Karabakh, coming under the control of ethnic Armenian forces during the First Nagorno-Karabakh War in the early 1990s. The village subsequently became part of the breakaway Republic of Artsakh as part of its Shushi Province and was referred to as Kirsavan. The village was returned to Azerbaijan on 1 December 2020 per the 2020 Nagorno-Karabakh ceasefire agreement.

Gallery

References

External links 
 

Villages in Azerbaijan
Populated places in Lachin District

Former Armenian inhabited settlements